Mengíbar Club de Fútbol was a Spanish football team  based in Mengíbar, in Jaén (Spanish province) in the autonomous community of Andalusia. Founded in 1993, its last season played in Tercera División - Group 9. The stadium was Estadio Ramón Díaz López with capacity of 500 seats.

History
At 2008-09 mid-season, the team was not presented in three matches, and therefore the club was relegated. After a while the club was dissolved due to financial problems.

Season to season

1 seasons in Tercera División

Noted players
  Lucien Moutassie (2006–2007)
  Lawrence Doe (2007–2008)

References

External links
 Mengíbar CF on LaPreferente.com

Defunct football clubs in Andalusia
Association football clubs established in 1993
Association football clubs disestablished in 2008
1993 establishments in Spain
2008 disestablishments in Spain